Beth Tabor (born 21 February 1964) is a Canadian former cyclist. She competed in the women's sprint event at the 1988 Summer Olympics.

References

External links
 

1964 births
Living people
Canadian female cyclists
Olympic cyclists of Canada
Cyclists at the 1988 Summer Olympics
Sportspeople from Toronto